Diuris emarginata, commonly called the late donkey orchid, is a species of orchid which is endemic to the south-west of Western Australia. It has up to six leaves and a flowering stem with up to eight yellow flowers with brown markings but only after fires the previous summer.

Description
Flowering occurs from November to January, but only after fire the previous summer.

Taxonomy and naming
Diuris emarginata was first formally described in 1810 by Robert Brown and the description was published in Prodromus Florae Novae Hollandiae et Insulae Van Diemen. The specific epithet (emarginata) is a Latin word meaning "without margin" or "notched at the apex".

Distribution and habitat
The late donkey orchid occurs in winter-wet areas mainly between Augusta and Albany in the Jarrah Forest and Warren biogeographic regions.

Conservation
Diuris emarginata is classified as "not threatened" by the Western Australian Government Department of Parks and Wildlife.

References

emarginata
Orchids of Western Australia
Endemic orchids of Australia
Plants described in 1810
Endemic flora of Western Australia